The electric blue hap (Sciaenochromis ahli) is a species of cichlid fish endemic to Lake Malawi. It prefers to live in caves and crevices in rocky substrates.  This species can reach a length of  TL.  It can also be found in the aquarium trade.

In the aquarium
The electric blue hap is a popular aquarium fish due to its colouration. It should be kept in tanks of no less than 150 litres. A semi aggressive fish, only one male is recommended per tank; however if large numbers are kept in a spacious enough environment, it is possible to keep more than one. Tank mates must be selected carefully. Large numbers prevent a single fish from being the target of aggression. The females are a drab grey in comparison and slightly smaller. They prefer rocky exhibits with coral sand.

Breeding
As with many other cichlids, the electric blue hap is a mouth-brooder. The recommended ratio of males to females is 1:4. The female broods for 2–3 weeks. When the fry are released, they are around 1 cm.

Etymology
The specific name of this fish honours the German zoologist Ernst Ahl (1898-1945) who originally described this species in 1926 as Haplochromis serranoides but this name had already been used by Charles Tate Regan in 1922, although Regan's name is a synonym of Haplochromis spekii.

References

Electric
Fish described in 1935
Taxonomy articles created by Polbot